Christopher Michael is an American actor, director, writer, who is most famous for portraying Sergeant/Detective/Captain/Chief Michaels on 7th Heaven.  He appeared in over 45 episodes throughout the show's 243-episode run.

Filmography
The Escapist (1983) as Radio Station Executive
South Bronx Heroes (1985) as Big Zeke
Heartbreak Ridge (1986) as Marine (as Christopher Lee Michael) 
Identity Crisis (1989) as Jailor 
New Jack City (1991) as Bailiff
Guyver: Dark Hero (1994) as Commander Atkins
The Fresh Prince of Bel-Air (1995) as Juror #2
Family Matters, Episode: "My Uncle the Hero" as Police officer who brought in a pick pocket suspect (1995)
The Cable Guy (1996) as Arresting Officer 
7th Heaven (1996–2007) as Sergeant/Detective/Captain/Chief Michaels
’’Fools Rush In’’ (1997) as Dam Police Officer who delivers baby
The Wayans Bros., Episode: “Fire!” as Arson Investigator (1998)
Friends (2001) as Airport Security Officer (deleted scene)
 New Alcatraz (2002) as Captain Thomas
 Drake & Josh (2004) as Doctor, Episode: "Dune Buggy"
 "24" (2008) as security officer at the FBI: Washington, DC branch
iCarly (2007, 2009) as Officer Carl, Episode: "iWant More Viewers"
The Young and the Restless (2009) as Jail Guard
The Secret Life of the American Teenager (2008-2012) as football coach/ interim guidance counselor at fiction Ulysses S. Grant High School
Hard Flip (2012) as Ralph
Grey's Anatomy (2012) as Ray
Castle (2014) as Officer Simms (episode "Driven")
 Brooklyn Nine-Nine (2014) as Officer Hank
Community (2015) as Security Guard #2 (episode "Laws of Robotics & Party Rights")

External links

Living people
Year of birth missing (living people)
American male television actors